Eric Linden (September 15, 1909 – July 14, 1994) was an American actor, primarily active during the 1930s.

Early years 
Eric Linden was born in New York City to Phillip and Elvira (née Lundborg) Linden, both of Swedish descent. His father was a professional pianist and an actor on stage with the Theater Royal when he lived in Stockholm, Sweden. When Eric was six, Phillip Linden deserted his family in New York City. 

To help support his mother, sister and two brothers, he began washing dishes at a cafe after school when he was 7 years old. He also sold newspapers on Tenth Avenue. Linden attended Angela Patri elementary school and participated in school plays at DeWitt Clinton High School. After graduation, he worked his way through Columbia University. His first job after graduating from Columbia was being a runner for a bank.

Writing
Linden had ambitions of becoming a writer rather than an actor. By the time he was 22 years old, he had written three plays and 40 short stories, but none had been published. He hoped to have saved enough money by age 30 to retire from acting and spend his time writing.

Stage
Linden trained with the Theatre Guild for two years and went on to appear on Broadway in addition to acting in stock theater in Stockbridge, Massachusetts and acting in Paris, France, with the Paris-American Company. He appeared in an adaption of Goethe's Faust on Broadway in 1928. Linden's other Broadway's credits include The Silver Cord, The Age of Consent, Life Begins, Sweepings, and Big City Blues.

Film career
Linden made his film debut during the Great Depression in RKO Radio Pictures' 1931 crime film, Are These Our Children?, where he played a young murderer who gets executed. He afterwards appeared in 33 films until 1941, mostly playing boyish second leads with occasional leading roles in smaller pictures.

Linden frequently portrayed "sensitive, intellectual, slightly weak-willed juveniles", sometimes with tragic destinies. His notable films include Big City Blues (1932) with Joan Blondell, Old Hutch (1936) opposite Wallace Beery, Ah, Wilderness! (1935) and A Family Affair (1937), both with Lionel Barrymore and Mickey Rooney, and The Good Old Soak (1937), again with Wallace Beery. In 1939, Linden had a small but memorable role in the hospital in Gone with the Wind (1939) as the desperate soldier whose leg has to be amputated without chloroform; Linden's role was originally planned to be more extensive, but his screen time was reduced to less than a minute in post-production. His career petered out and he left Hollywood after his final role, a leading part in the low-budget-picture Criminals Within (1941).

Later years
 
Eric Linden played in a few stage roles and then served in the Second World War. He later retired from acting and worked for the County of Orange  in California. 

He married late in life in 1955, age 46; he and wife Jo Brown, an artist, settled in Laguna Beach, California and had three children: Karen, David and Andrea. They divorced in 1977.

Death
Linden died on July 14, 1994, in South Laguna Beach, California, aged 84.

Recognition
Linden has a star at 7098 Hollywood Boulevard in the Motion Pictures section of the Hollywood Walk of Fame. It was dedicated on February 8, 1960.

Filmography

 

 Are These Our Children? (1931) - Edward 'Eddie' Brand
 Young Bride (1932) - Charlie Riggs
 The Crowd Roars (1932) - Edward 'Eddie' Greer
 The Roadhouse Murder (1932) - Chick Brian
 The Age of Consent (1932) - Duke Galloway
 Life Begins (1932) - Jed Sutton
 Big City Blues (1932) - Bud Reeves
 Afraid to Talk (1932) - Eddie Martin
 No Other Woman (1933) - Joe Zarcovia
 The Past of Mary Holmes (1933) - Geoffrey Holmes
 Sweepings (1933) - Freddie Pardway
 The Silver Cord (1933) - Robert Phelps
 Flying Devils  (1933) - Bud Murray
 I Give My Love (1934) - Paul Vadja Jr. - at Age 21
 Let 'Em Have It (1935) - Buddy Spencer
 Ladies Crave Excitement (1935) - Bob Starke
 Born to Gamble (1935) - Earl Mathews
 Ah, Wilderness! (1935) - Richard Miller
 The Voice of Bugle Ann (1936) - Benjy Davis
 Robin Hood of El Dorado (1936) - Johnnie 'Jack' Warren
 In His Steps (1936) - Tom Carver
 Old Hutch (1936) - David 'Dave' Jolly
 Career Woman (1936) - Everett Clark
 A Family Affair (1937) - Wayne Trent III
 Girl Loves Boy (1937) - Robert Conrad
 The Good Old Soak (1937) - Clemmie Hawley
 Sweetheart of the Navy (1937) - Eddie Harris
 Here's Flash Casey (1938) - Flash Casey
 Midnight Intruder (1938) - John Clark Reitter Jr., posing as Jay Rogers
 Romance of the Limberlost (1938) - Wayne
 Everything's on Ice (1939) - Leopold Eddington
 Gone with the Wind (1939) - Amputation Case
 Criminals Within (1941) - Cpl. Greg Carroll (final film role)

References

External links

Eric Linden at Virtual History
Eric Linden: Too Much Youth
Eric Linden and Loretta Young in scenes from Life Begins (1932) from YouTube

1909 births
1994 deaths
American male film actors
American people of Swedish descent
Columbia University alumni
20th-century American male actors
DeWitt Clinton High School alumni